Aliyu Sabiu Muduru, RT. HON, Walin Gabas of Katsina I  (born 3 January 1983) is a Nigerian politician who is the former Speaker of the Katsina State House of Assembly.

Aliyu Muduru is a member of the All Progressives Congress who has served in the Katsina State House of Assembly representing Mani constituency since 2015.

References

External links
 

1983 births
Living people
Nigerian politicians